Agononida fortiantennata is a species of squat lobster in the family Munididae. It is found in the Moluccas off of the west coast of the Philippines and in Vanuatu.

References

Squat lobsters
Crustaceans described in 1988